Malacocis is a genus of beetles in the family Ciidae, containing the following species:

 Malacocis bahiensis Pic, 1916
 Malacocis brevicollis (Casey, 1898)
 Malacocis championi Gorham, 1886

References

Ciidae genera